Riaz Hussain Pirzada (born 1 August 1948) is a Pakistani politician who has been a member of the National Assembly of Pakistan since August 2018. Previously, he was a member of the National Assembly between 1993 and May 2018 and was a member of the Provincial Assembly of Punjab from 1985 to 1988.

He served as Minister for Inter Provincial Coordination, in Abbasi cabinet from August 2017 to May 2018. A leader of Pakistan Muslim League (Nawaz), Previously Pirzada served as Federal Minister for Inter Provincial Co-ordination from 2013 to 2017. He served as Federal Minister for Minorities, Minister for Health in 2011 and Minister for Professional and Technical Training from 2011 to 2012.
He serves as Minister of Human Rights since 19 April 2022.

Early life and education
Pirzada was born on 1 August 1948 in Sheikh Wahan, Bahawalpur. He received his LL.B Degree from University Law College, Lahore in 1969.

Political career
Pirzada was elected to the Provincial Assembly of Punjab in 1985 Pakistani general election where he served until 1988. During his tenure as member of the Punjab Assembly, he served as Provincial Minister of Punjab.

He was elected to the National Assembly of Pakistan as a candidate of Pakistan Peoples Party (PPP) from Constituency NA-143 (Bahawalpur) in 1993 Pakistani general election where he served until 1997.

He was elected to the National Assembly as a candidate of National Alliance from Constituency NA-186 (Bahawalpur-IV) in 2002 Pakistani general election. He received 60,456 votes and defeated Syed Tasneem Nawaz Gardezi, a candidate of [[Pakistan Muslim League (Q) (PML-Q).

He was re-elected to the National Assembly as a candidate of PML-Q from Constituency NA-186 (Bahawalpur-IV) in 2008 Pakistani general election. He received 66,757 votes and defeated an independent candidate, Syed Tasneem Nawaz Gardezi. In May 2011, he was inducted into the federal cabinet of Prime Minister Yousaf Raza Gillani and was made Federal Minister of Minorities where he served May 2011. In May 2011, he was made Federal Minister for Health where he served until June 2011. From 1 July to 29 July 2011, he remained in the federal cabinet without any ministerial portfolio. On 30 July 2011, he was made Minister of Federal Education and Professional Training where he served June 2012.

He was re-elected to the National Assembly as a candidate of Pakistan Muslim League (N) (PML-N) from Constituency NA-186 (Bahawalpur-IV) in 2013 Pakistani general election. He received 74,491 votes and defeated Tariq Bashir Cheema.

In June 2013, he was inducted into the federal cabinet of Prime Minister Nawaz Sharif and was made Federal Minister for Inter-provincial Coordination. In 2017, he resigned from his post of Minister for Inter-provincial Coordination in protest alleging that there was interference in his ministry by the principal secretary of Prime Minister Nawaz Sharif.

He had ceased to hold ministerial office in July 2017 when the federal cabinet was disbanded following the resignation of Prime Minister Nawaz Sharif after Panama Papers case decision. Following the election of Shahid Khaqan Abbasi as Prime Minister of Pakistan in August 2017, he was inducted into the federal cabinet of Abbasi. He was appointed as federal minister for Inter Provincial Coordination. Upon the dissolution of the National Assembly on the expiration of its term on 31 May 2018, Pirzada ceased to hold the office as Federal Minister for Inter Provincial Coordination.

He was re-elected to the National Assembly as a candidate of PML-N from Constituency NA-171 (Bahawalpur-II) in 2018 Pakistani general election.

References

Living people
Pakistan Muslim League (N) politicians
Punjabi people
Pakistani MNAs 2013–2018
1948 births
Government ministers of Pakistan
Pakistani MNAs 1993–1996
Pakistani MNAs 2008–2013
Punjab MPAs 1985–1988
Pakistani MNAs 2018–2023